The kangani system was a form of labour recruitment and organisation in parts of Southeast Asia under British colonial rule, generally in operation from the early 19th century until the early 20th century, specifically the areas now known as Myanmar, Malaysia, and Sri Lanka. The system was similar to indentured servitude and both were in operation during the same period, with the kangani system becoming more popular from late 19th century onward. Under the kangani system, recruitment and management were taken up by people called the kangani (from the Tamil word for 'The one who observes', an equivalent for the English word foreman; The root word 'Kan' in Tamil means eye.), who directly recruited migrants from India—especially South India in Tamil-majority areas—via networks of friends, family and other contacts, with that same person then responsible for the supervision of the labourers they recruited. The leader of these groups of immigrants had considerable control over their affairs and generally forced them to enter debt-bondage relationships by illegally deducting their wages. In smaller groups, they might work as labourers themselves in addition to their other responsibilities but in larger groups their role was more one of organisation, supervision and dealing with the landowner.  With certain estimates showing that nearly 1 in 8 Indian labourers in Burma was a kangani, some have argued that stepping into the role of recruiter and supervisor, with its accompanied rise in income and status, was a relatively achievable form of social mobility among the labourers of the plantations

References

Further reading 

Labor relations
Labor history
South Asian culture